Peranee Kongthai (born July 28, 1989) known internationally as Matt Peranee, is a Thai actress and model.

Filmography

Film

Television

Commercials
CM Cute Press
CM BSC Cosmetology
CM Eucerin White
CM Lux
CM Sony
CM Vaseline
CM Essence
CM Olay
CM Bear Brand Milk
CM Clear Shampoo

Awards

References

1989 births
Living people
Peranee Kongthai
Peranee Kongthai
Peranee Kongthai
Peranee Kongthai
Place of birth missing (living people)
Peranee Kongthai
Peranee Kongthai
Peranee Kongthai